"Dream On" is a song written by Dennis Lambert and Brian Potter.  
In 1974, The Righteous Brothers had a hit version, reaching No. 32 on the Billboard Hot 100, and No. 6 on the U.S. and Canadian Adult Contemporary charts. Bill Medley and Bobby Hatfield alternate lead vocals.

Critical reception
Billboard described it as "a powerful ballad" that is "reminiscent in parts of some of the Righteous Brothers earlier Phil Spector material" and praised the vocal performance.

Chart performance

The Oak Ridge Boys recording

In 1979, the song was recorded by American country music group The Oak Ridge Boys. It was released as the third single from their album The Oak Ridge Boys Have Arrived.  This is the Oak Ridge Boys' only single to prominently feature bass singer Richard Sterban on lead vocals.

The song spent thirteen weeks within the top 40 of the Hot Country Songs charts and peaked at number seven. In Canada, the song spent three weeks at the number one position on the RPM Country Tracks chart, reaching that position on the November 3, 1979 chart and staying there for one week.

Chart performance

References

1974 singles
1979 singles
1974 songs
The Righteous Brothers songs
The Oak Ridge Boys songs
Song recordings produced by Ron Chancey
MCA Records singles
Songs written by Dennis Lambert
Songs written by Brian Potter (musician)